In probability theory and statistics, the Rayleigh distribution is a continuous probability distribution for nonnegative-valued random variables. Up to rescaling, it coincides with the chi distribution with two degrees of freedom.
The distribution is named after Lord Rayleigh.

A Rayleigh distribution is often observed when the overall magnitude of a vector is related to its directional components. One example where the Rayleigh distribution naturally arises is when wind velocity is analyzed in two dimensions.
Assuming that each component is uncorrelated, normally distributed with equal variance, and zero mean, then the overall wind speed (vector magnitude) will be characterized by a Rayleigh distribution.   
A second example of the distribution arises in the case of random complex numbers whose real and imaginary components are independently and identically distributed Gaussian with equal variance and zero mean. In that case, the absolute value of the complex number is Rayleigh-distributed.

Definition

The probability density function of the Rayleigh  distribution is

where  is the scale parameter of the distribution. The cumulative distribution function is

for

Relation to random vector length

Consider the two-dimensional vector  which has components that are bivariate normally distributed, centered at zero, and independent.  Then  and  have density functions

That is,   Then  has cumulative distribution function

where  is the disk

Writing the double integral in polar coordinates, it becomes

which is the Rayleigh distribution. It is straightforward to generalize to vectors of dimension other than 2. 
There are also generalizations when the components have unequal variance or correlations (Hoyt distribution), or when the vector Y follows a bivariate Student t-distribution (see also: Hotelling's T-squared distribution).

Suppose  is a random vector with components  that follows a multivariate t-distribution. If the components both have mean zero, equal variance, and are independent, the bivariate Student's-t distribution takes the form:

Then the cumulative distribution function (CDF) of the magnitude is:

where  is the disk defined by:

Converting to polar coordinates leads to the CDF becoming:

Finally, the probability density function (PDF) of the magnitude may be derived:

Properties
The raw  moments are given by:
  
where  is the gamma function.

The mean of a  Rayleigh  random variable  is thus :

The standard deviation of a  Rayleigh  random variable  is:

The variance   of a  Rayleigh  random variable  is :

The skewness is given by:

The excess kurtosis is given by:

The characteristic function is given by:

where  is the imaginary error function. The moment generating function is given by

where  is the error function.

Differential entropy

The differential entropy is given by

where  is the Euler–Mascheroni constant.

Parameter estimation 

Given a sample of N independent and identically distributed Rayleigh random variables  with parameter ,

  is the maximum likelihood estimate and also is unbiased.

 is a biased estimator that can be corrected via the formula

Confidence intervals 
To find the (1 − α) confidence interval, first find the bounds  where:
  
then the scale parameter will fall within the bounds

Generating random variates 

Given a random variate U drawn from the uniform distribution in the interval (0, 1), then the variate

has a Rayleigh distribution with parameter . This is obtained by applying the inverse transform sampling-method.

Related distributions

This gives motivation to the use of the symbol  in the above parametrization of the Rayleigh density.

 The magnitude  of a standard complex normally distributed variable z is Rayleigh distributed.

 The chi distribution with v = 2 is equivalent to the Rayleigh Distribution with σ = 1. 

 If , then  has a chi-squared distribution with parameter , degrees of freedom, equal to two (N = 2)
  

 If , then  has a gamma distribution with parameters  and 
 

 The Rice distribution is a noncentral generalization of the Rayleigh distribution: .
 The Weibull distribution with the shape parameter k=2 yields a Rayleigh distribution.  Then the Rayleigh distribution parameter  is related to the Weibull scale parameter according to 
 The Maxwell–Boltzmann distribution describes the magnitude of a normal vector in three dimensions.
 If  has an exponential distribution , then 

 The half-normal distribution is the univariate special case of the Rayleigh distribution.

Applications 

An application of the estimation of σ can be found in magnetic resonance imaging (MRI). As MRI images are recorded as complex images but most often viewed as magnitude images, the background data is Rayleigh distributed. Hence, the above formula can be used to estimate the noise variance in an MRI image from background data.
 

The Rayleigh distribution was also employed in the field of nutrition for linking dietary nutrient levels and human and animal responses. In this way, the parameter σ may be used to calculate nutrient response relationship.

In the field of ballistics, the Rayleigh distribution is used for calculating the circular error probable—a measure of a weapon's precision.

In physical oceanography, the distribution of significant wave height approximately follows a Rayleigh distribution.

See also
Circular error probable
Rayleigh fading
Rayleigh mixture distribution
Rice distribution

References 

Continuous distributions
Exponential family distributions